Honam (literally "south of the lake") is a region coinciding with the former Jeolla Province in what is now South Korea. Today, the term refers to Gwangju, South Jeolla and North Jeolla Provinces. The name "Jeonla-do" is used in the names of the Honam railway line and Honam Expressway, which are major transportation corridors connecting Seoul and Daejeon to the Honam region. The name is often used to refer to people residing in the region. There is also Honam University, which is located in Gwangju, the biggest city in Honam.

See also
 Gwangju
 North Jeolla Province
 South Jeolla Province
 Regions of Korea
 Yeongnam

References

Regions of Korea